Daan Janzing (born 17 November 1981) is a Dutch guitarist and producer. He is one of the guitar players for the Dark rock band My Favorite Scar.

Biography
Daan was born in the Netherlands and started playing the guitar at the age of 9. He played in his first band when he was 12 years old. But the more serious bands came when he was in highschool at the age of 16.

Since highschool he has played in bands such as Mad Bombers (punk rock), the Louts (hardcore), Antro (death metal/nu metal) and Bodybag Society (modern death metal).
After a long break in 2006, he was invited by Ivar de Graaf (ex-Within Temptation) to Kingfisher Sky. With Daan, they recorded the first album of Kingfisher Sky titled Hallway (2007).
In 2010, he left the band for his new project; My Favorite Scar.

Daan was invited to My Favorite Scar by Van Riet Jeroen and Evan Reed, whom he knew from their previous band Feeler; they were the supporting act of the band which Daan worked.
He started work with producer Oscar Holleman (producer of My Favorite Scar, Within Temptation, Krezip, Gorefest, After Forever).
The debut album of My Favorite Scar was released in 2010 by Universal. Dan is currently working on recording the second album.

Equipment

When My Favorite Scar began, they got in contact with PB Music, the Dutch distributor for Laney amps. They got a Laney endorsement, it became an important ingredient for the MFS sound. Another brand PB Music is distributing is Cort guitars. Cort was interested to make a Daan signature model, where he could point out some necessary features. So he designed the model which Daan is currently playing. It is a custom Cort M600 model, but with string through body, Ebony fretboard (with only MFS logo inlay on 12th fret), EMG 81 TW active pickups, and Sperzel tuners. This guitar been used on stage and in the studio on multiple occasions.

References

External links
Dan Scar on cortguitars.com
My Favorite Scar official website

1981 births
Living people
Dutch rock guitarists
Dutch male guitarists
Musicians from Tilburg
21st-century guitarists
21st-century male musicians